Rhizomelic dysplasia, scoliosis, and retinitis pigmentosa is a very rare genetic disorder which is characterized by ocular/visual, dental and osseous anomalies. Only 2 cases have been described in medical literature.

Signs and symptoms 

The following is a list of symptoms that this disorder causes:

Amelogenesis imperfecta
Biconcave vertebrae
Wide ribs
Photophobia
Deltoid tuberosity prominence
Reduced visual acuity
Limb rhizomelia
Cone-rod dystrophy
Scoliosis
Shortening of the clavicles
Shortening of the ribs
Short neck
Shortening of the humerus
Strabismus
Vision impairment
Short radius bone epiphysis
Retinitis pigmentosa
Short stature

Etimology 

This condition was first described in 2006 by Megarbane et al. when they described 2 cousins from a consanguineous  Labenese family. Only one of them had amelogenesis imperfecta.

References 

Genetic diseases and disorders